Martin Richards (born 21 July 1940) is a British computer scientist known for his development of the BCPL programming language which is both part of early research into portable software, and the ancestor of the B programming language invented by Ken Thompson in early versions of Unix and which Dennis Ritchie in turn used as the basis of his widely used C programming language.

Education
Richards studied mathematics as an undergraduate student at the University of Cambridge and took the Cambridge Diploma in Computer Science. His PhD was on programming language design and implementation. He was a senior lecturer at the University of Cambridge Computer Laboratory until his retirement in 2007.

Research
In addition to BCPL Richards' work includes the development of the TRIPOS portable operating system.

He was awarded the IEEE Computer Society's Computer Pioneer Award in 2003 for "pioneering system software portability through the programming language BCPL".

Richards is a fellow of St John's College at the University of Cambridge.

References

Living people
Fellows of St John's College, Cambridge
History of computing in the United Kingdom
Members of the University of Cambridge Computer Laboratory
Programming language designers
1940 births